Mestečko is a village and municipality in Púchov District in the Trenčín Region of north-western Slovakia.

History
In historical records the village was first mentioned in 1471.

Geography
It has a population of about 505 people.

External links
 
https://web.archive.org/web/20071027094149/http://www.statistics.sk/mosmis/eng/run.html

Villages and municipalities in Púchov District